Pargo may refer to:

 Pargo Kaling, in Lhasa, Tibet
 Jannero Pargo (born 1979), American basketball coach and former player
 Jeremy Pargo (born 1986), American basketball player
 A fish also known as the red snapper 
 , the name of several United States Navy ships